Johann Wilhelm Krause may refer to:
 Johann Wilhelm Krause (architect) (1757–1828), Baltic-German architect
 Johann Wilhelm Krause (botanist) (1764–1842), German botanist